Patrick McMahon (5 December 1933 – 4 April 2021) was a British show jumping champion.

McMahon was born in Derby. He won the European Show Jumping Championships in 1973 on Penwood Forge Mill, beating German Alwin Schockemöhle. In the same year he was voted in third place for the BBC Sports Personality of the Year Award.

References 

British show jumping riders
2021 deaths
1933 births